KCWV (channel 27) is a religious television station in Duluth, Minnesota, United States, owned and operated by Tri-State Christian Television (TCT). The station's transmitter is located on the former KDLH tower on Duluth's Observation Hill.

History
The Federal Communications Commission (FCC) granted George S. Flinn, III a construction permit for the digital-only station on channel 27 on December 6, 2006. The station signed on November 30, 2009.

Flinn is a Memphis businessman who, until 2007, owned Ion Television affiliates WPXX-TV in Memphis and WPXL-TV in New Orleans.

At its start, KCWV was affiliated with My Family TV. Within a year after the station debuted, it re-affiliated with Legacy TV, a small Christian broadcasting network. Towards the end of 2012, the religious network changed its name from Legacy TV to The Walk TV. During late October 2013, KCWV re-affiliated again with AMGTV, a family-oriented television network.

On September 17, 2014, it was announced that KCWV would be off the air for a couple of months, as its tower was undergoing replacement. It returned to the air on September 21, 2015 from a new, shorter tower. Since that point it has continued to broadcast intermittently, having been off the air from a period of the spring of 2018 until coming back in May 2019, continuing to carry AMGTV. The station has never sold local commercial advertising.

On May 28, 2020, Flinn Broadcasting Corporation announced that it would sell KCWV, along with sister stations WWJX in Jackson, Mississippi, WBIH in Selma, Alabama, and WFBD in Destin, Florida, to Marion, Illinois-based Tri-State Christian Television for an undisclosed price. The sale was completed on September 15; the stations became owned-and-operated stations of the TCT network two days later.

Subchannels
The station's digital signal is multiplexed:

References

External links

Technical exhibit submitted as part of Flinn's application for a new station

Tri-State Christian Television affiliates
Grit (TV network) affiliates
Bounce TV affiliates
Twist (TV network) affiliates
GetTV affiliates
Television stations in Duluth, Minnesota
Television channels and stations established in 2009
2009 establishments in Minnesota